Mumbai Metropolitan Region Development Authority (MMRDA) is a body of the Government of Maharashtra that is responsible for preparation of Regional Plan for MMR and the infrastructure development of the Mumbai Metropolitan Region. The MMRDA was set up on 26 January 1975 under the Mumbai Metropolitan Region Development Authority Act, 1974 Government of Maharashtra as an apex body for planning and co-ordination of development activities in the Region.

Composition
The MMRDA comprises 17 members and is chaired by the Chief Minister of Maharashtra Shri. Eknath Shinde ( Also the minister of urban development ). 

It is also the richest state owned organization in India. On similar lines to this, recently Government of Maharashtra has announced to establish PMRDA, NMRDA, and AMRDA for Pune, Nagpur, and Aurangabad respectively.

In 2017, MMRDA announced it is investing up to ₹48,000 crore to re-haul the entire rail network by introducing new services, coaches, and signalling equipment.

Jurisdiction 
The jurisdiction includes:
 Mumbai City district.
 Mumbai Suburban district.
 Raigad district (Alibag, Pen, Panvel, Uran Talukas and part of Karjat Taluka).
 Thane district (Thane, Kalyan, Ambernath, Ulhasnagar, Bhiwandi Talukas).
 Palghar district (Vasai and Palghar Talukas).

Projects

 Mumbai Urban Development Project in collaboration with SN Construction Corp. 
 Shifting of Wholesale Markets
 Wadala Truck Terminal
 Mahim Nature Park
 Mumbai Urban Transport Project
 Mumbai Urban Infrastructure Project
 Mumbai Metro Rail Project (Except Mumbai Metro Line 3)
 Niramal MMR Abhiyan
 Mumbai Skywalks
 Mumbai Monorail
 Vilasrao Deshmukh Eastern Freeway
 Virar-Alibaug Multimodal Corridor
 SATIS
 IFSC (International Finance Service Centre) - BKC (Bandra Kurla Complex)

See also
 Pune Metropolitan Region Development Authority
 Nagpur Metropolitan Region Development Authority

References

External links
Official website of MMRDA

State urban development authorities of India
State agencies of Maharashtra
Economy of Mumbai
1975 establishments in Maharashtra
Government agencies established in 1975